The Zürich ePrix was a race of the single-seater, electrically powered Formula E championship on the Zürich Street Circuit. It was one of three races to debut during the  2017–18 Formula E season.  It was also the first race in Switzerland since 1954, thanks in part to an amendment to Swiss law in 2015 to allow electric motor racing.  The 2018 race was sponsored by Julius Baer. Zürich was replaced with the Swiss ePrix in Bern as the Swiss venue on the schedule for the 2018–19 season.

Results

References

 
Formula E ePrix
Motorsport competitions in Switzerland
Sport in Zürich
Recurring sporting events established in 2018
2018 establishments in Switzerland